Mr. Fix can refer to:

 The Fixer, a supervillain in Marvel Comics
 Mr. Fix, a character in Around the World in Eighty Days by Jules Verne